Philipp Jarnach (26 July 1892 17 December 1982 in Börnsen) was a German composer of modern music ("Neue Musik"), pianist, teacher, and conductor.

Jarnach was born in Noisy-le-Sec, France, the son of a Spanish sculptor and a Flemish mother. Besides composer such as Hindemith, Jarnach is considered one of the leading and  formative composer of the late German Romantic and early modern ("Neue Musik") eras. Until 1914 he lived in Paris, where he studied piano under Édouard Risler and harmony under Albert Lavignac at the Conservatoire de Paris. During the First World War he was a student of Ferruccio Busoni in Zürich. He later completed the opera Doktor Faust which Busoni had left unfinished on his death in 1924.

In the 1920s Jarnach worked in Berlin as a pianist, conductor and composer. In 1927 he became a teacher in composition at the Hochschule für Musik Köln. In 1949 he founded the Hamburger Musikhochschule (Hamburg Music Academy) which he directed until 1959 and at which he taught until 1970. His students included Ivan Rebroff (Hans Rolf Rippert as he was then, during his attendance at the Hochschule between 1950 and 1958), Kurt Weill, Otto Luening, Wilhelm Maler, Bernd Alois Zimmermann, Jürg Baur, Walter Steffens, Colin Brumby, Eberhard Werdin and Nikos Skalkottas.  In 1982, he died in Börnsen. 

Jarnach composed a Sinfonia brevis, a prelude for large orchestra, a quartet and a quintet for strings, further chamber music, especially for violin and piano, and vocal works.

Awards and Achievements 
 1954: Bach-Preis der Freien und Hansestadt Hamburg
 1955: Member of the Akademie der Künste (Berlin)
 1955: Berliner Kunstpreis
 Member of Freien Akademie der Künste in Hamburg

References

1892 births
1982 deaths
German male composers
German male conductors (music)
German pianists
Hochschule für Musik und Theater Hamburg
Academic staff of the Hochschule für Musik und Tanz Köln
Pupils of Ferruccio Busoni
Pupils of Paul Juon
20th-century German conductors (music)
20th-century German composers
20th-century pianists
German male pianists
20th-century German male musicians